Celtic has been the name of a number of ships:

, a White Star Line liner
, a White Star Line liner
, built as a sailing barge in 1903 and converted to a motorship in 1941
, a U.S. Navy supply ship

Ship names